LC is the second studio album by English band The Durutti Column. It was released in November 1981 through Manchester record label Factory.

Background 

The album was the first to feature drummer and percussionist Bruce Mitchell. The song "The Missing Boy" is a tribute to songwriter Vini Reilly's friend and label-mate Ian Curtis of Joy Division, who committed suicide in the previous year.

Release 

LC was released in November 1981.

It was reissued in January 2013 on the reactivated Factory Benelux as a double-CD package.

Track listing

2013 track listing 

The 2013 reissue includes the Sordide Sentimental single "Danny"/"Enigma", the Deux Triangles 12" (the original FBN-10), the tracks on A Factory Quartet, Crépuscule compilation album tracks, and demo versions of tracks from LC.

 Disc one

 "Sketch for Dawn (1)"
 "Portrait for Frazier"
 "Jaqueline"
 "Messidor"
 "Sketch for Dawn (2)"
 "Never Known"
 "The Act Committed"
 "Detail for Paul"
 "The Missing Boy"
 "The Sweet Cheat Gone"
 "Danny"
 "Enigma"
 "For Mimi"
 "For Belgian Friends"
 "Self-Portrait"
 "Favourite Painting"
 "Zinni"

 Disc two

 "Mavuchka"
 "Experiment in Fifth"
 "Portrait for Paul"
 "The Act Committed"
 "Portrait for Frazier"
 "Never Known"
 "Untitled LC Demo"
 "For Patti"
 "Weakness and Fever"
 "The Eye and the Hand"
 "Party"
 "One Christmas for Your Thoughts"
 "Hommage to Martinů"
 "Sleep Will Come"
 "Piece for an Ideal"
 "Piece of Out of Tune Grand Piano"

Reception 

AllMusic wrote, "As great as Return is, this is perhaps even better, signaling a full flowering of [Vini] Reilly's talents throughout the album."

Brian Eno claimed Reilly's album LC as his all-time favourite album.

Personnel 

 The Durutti Column

 Vini Reilly – vocals, all other instruments, production
 Bruce Mitchell – percussion

 Additional personnel

 Stewart Pickering – production
 EG – mastering
 Les Thompson – sleeve design
 GYL – sleeve artwork
 Jackie Williams – sleeve painting
 John Nichols – sleeve photography

References

External links 

 

1981 albums
The Durutti Column albums
Factory Records albums